Denis "Dinny" Doyle (born 1900, date of death unknown) was an Irish football wing half who played professionally in Ireland and the United States.  He earned one cap with the Irish Free State national football team in 1926. He was born in Dublin.

He joined Shamrock Rovers F.C. in 1922 and played in that year's FAI Cup final which they lost in a replay. He then moved back to centre-half until he left the club in 1927.  That year, he moved to the USA with Bob Fullam where he signed with the Philadelphia Celtic of the American Soccer League.  The team played only ten games before failing financially.  He then transferred to the Fall River Marksmen. He won three league titles with the Marksmens.  He began the 1929-1930 season with the Marksmen, playing three games, before transferring to the Pawtucket Rangers.  In 1931, he moved to the New York Yankees. He spent his last years in Niagara Falls.

He won one cap for the Irish Free State against Italy in Turin on 21 March 1926.

He was part of the Rovers sides that won two leagues in the 1920s going through the entire season unbeaten. He was also part of the side that played in the club's opening fixtures at Glenmalure Park in 1926.

His father, Tommy Doyle, had played for the Hoops in the early years and his younger brother, also Tommy,  played for Rovers after Dinny emigrated. A nephew, Jackie Mooney, won two FAI Cups with Rovers in the 1960s. Dinny's great grandson, Jason Doyle, played for Rovers during the 1991–1992 season. Dinny's brother, Christy (Kit), born 1904, had a son also named Christy who played in Toronto, New York and Chicago in the 1960s and had the honor of winning both the United States and Canadian amateur National Championships in the same year 1968. With the Chicago Kickers in July 1968 and the Toronto Royals in September 1968 before returning to Chicago in 1969 and rejoining the Kickers to win the title again in 1970. Now retired in Charlotte, North Carolina.

Honours
League of Ireland: 3
  Shamrock Rovers - 1922–23, 1924–25, 1926–27
FAI Cup: 1
  Shamrock Rovers - 1925
League of Ireland Shield: 2
  Shamrock Rovers - 1924-25, 1926–27
Leinster Senior Cup: 1
  Shamrock Rovers - 1923
Leinster Senior League: 1
  Shamrock Rovers - 1921–22

References

Sources
 The Hoops by Paul Doolan and Robert Goggins

Association footballers from County Dublin
Republic of Ireland association footballers
Irish Free State international footballers
Association football wing halves
Shamrock Rovers F.C. players
Fall River Marksmen players
League of Ireland players
American Soccer League (1921–1933) players
Philadelphia Celtic players
Pawtucket Rangers players
New York Yankees (soccer) players
1900 births
Year of death missing
Irish Free State association footballers
Leinster Senior League (association football) players